The following television stations broadcast on digital or analog channel 40 in Canada:

 CFCN-TV-13 in Pigeon Mountain, Alberta
 CHNB-TV-13 in Miramichi, New Brunswick
 CHOT-DT in Gatineau, Quebec
 CIVK-DT-2 in Percé, Quebec
 CJCH-TV-7 in Yarmouth, Nova Scotia
 CJMT-DT in Toronto, Ontario
 CKND-DT in Winnipeg, Manitoba

40 TV stations in Canada